William Russell Robinson (February 5, 1942 – June 9, 2020) was an American politician who served as a member of the Pennsylvania House of Representatives from 1989 to 2002.

Early life and education 
A native of Pittsburgh, Robinson is a 1960 graduate of Schenley High School. He earned a degree in political science from Ohio State University in 1964 and a master's degree in political science from Duquesne University in 1972.

Career 
Robinson began his career as a member of the Pittsburgh City Council.

He was first elected to represent the 19th legislative district in the Pennsylvania House of Representatives in 1988. He was defeated in the 2002 Democratic primary by Jake Wheatley, a staffer for Pittsburgh City Councilman Sala Udin, a Robinson rival.

Death 
Robinson died on June 9, 2020 in Pittsburgh.

References

External links

1942 births
2020 deaths
20th-century American politicians
21st-century American politicians
African-American state legislators in Pennsylvania
Duquesne University alumni
Democratic Party members of the Pennsylvania House of Representatives
Ohio State University College of Arts and Sciences alumni
Politicians from Pittsburgh
Pittsburgh City Council members
20th-century African-American politicians
21st-century African-American politicians